Keyser Township is one of fifteen townships in DeKalb County, Indiana. As of the 2010 census, its population was 7,666 and it contained 3,087 housing units.

History
Keyser Township had its start in 1876, when the Baltimore and Ohio Railroad constructed a railroad through the area.

The Samuel Bevier House, Joseph Bowman Farmhouse, Breechbill-Davidson House, Brethren in Christ Church, Orin Clark House, DeKalb County Home and Barn, William Fountain House, Gump House, Edward Kelham House, Charles Lehmback Farmstead, Rakestraw House, and Henry Shull Farmhouse Inn were added to the National Register of Historic Places in 1983.

Geography

Cities and towns
 Altona
 Auburn (west edge)
 Garrett

Adjacent townships
 Richland Township (north)
 Jackson Township (east)
 Union Township (east)
 Butler Township (south)
 Allen Township, Noble County (west)
 Swan Township, Noble County (west)

Major highways
  Interstate 69
  State Road 8
  State Road 327

Cemeteries
The township contains two cemeteries: Calvary and Embrey.

References
 
 United States Census Bureau cartographic boundary files

External links

 Indiana Township Association
 United Township Association of Indiana

Townships in DeKalb County, Indiana
Townships in Indiana
1876 establishments in Indiana
Populated places established in 1876